The zebra spinyeel (Mastacembelus zebratus) is a species of fish in the family Mastacembelidae. It is endemic to Lake Tanganyika where it is a secretive species which hides among rocks or in the sediments.

References

zebra spinyeel
Fish of Lake Tanganyika
Taxonomy articles created by Polbot
zebra spinyeel
Taxa named by Hubert Matthes